Siegmund Hildesheimer (1832–1896) was a German-born British publisher, best known for Christmas and other greetings cards, and postcards, produced by Siegmund Hildesheimer & Co Ltd, in London and Manchester.

He was born in Halberstadt, Germany, the son of Abraham Hildesheimer and Sara Meyer. He moved to Manchester, England in the mid-1870s.

His younger brother Albert Hildesheimer (1843–1924) was also active in publishing Christmas cards, and in 1881 went into partnership with Charles William Faulkner, as Hildesheimer & Faulkner, with offices at 41 Jewin Street, London.

On 15 August 1858, Hildesheimer married Pauline Hirsh, and they had two daughters, Margarethe Hildesheimer and Anna Hildesheimer.

He used some of early Beatrix Potter's drawings of rabbits for on Christmas cards that he published.

References

External links

1832 births
1896 deaths
Postcard publishers